Namgyal, a Tibetan deity, has been a personal name in several countries; see (inter alia):
Dagpo Tashi Namgyal, a 16th-century Tibetan Buddhist scholar of the Dagpo Kagyu lineage
Namgyal dynasty, rulers in Sikkim
Namgyal dynasty of Ladakh, rulers in Ladakh
Namgyal Institute of Tibetology
Namgyal Monastery, any of several Tibetan Buddhist institutions
Namgyal Monastery Institute of Buddhist Studies
Namgyal Lhamo, exponent of Tibetan singing
Namgyal Rinpoche, Karma Tenzin Dorje (1931-2003), born Leslie George Dawson, in Toronto, Canada
Palden Thondup Namgyal, last hereditary ruler of Sikkim, husband of Hope Cooke
Phuntsog Namgyal, first king of Sikkim
Ngawang Namgyal, founder of Bhutan
Tashi Namgyal, ruler of Sikkim from 1914 to 1963
Tashi Namgyal Academy in Sikkim
Thutob Namgyal, who transferred Sikkim's capital to Gangtok in 1894
Tshudpud Namgyal, longest-reigning king of Sikkim (from 1793 to 1863); regained independence from Nepal in 1815